Madhavaram Milk Colony is a neighbourhood in north of Chennai, a metropolitan city in Chennai district in the Indian state of Tamil Nadu.

Madhavaram Milk Colony is a small habitat of 5000+ population in the northern part of Chennai. Due to the set up of first co-operative milk producing union Aavin of Chennai, this place was called Madhavaram Milk Colony. Tamil Nadu Veterinary and Animal Sciences University is situated here. A pharmacy major - Retort Laboratories and Herbal Soap manufacturer - Medimix also have their presence here. In addition, the palm project and horticulture society have their presence here. The domestic animals park inside the Milk colony is an attraction for children. The Madhavaram Botanical Garden is situated here.

Religious and Divinity
 Sri Arulmigu Ponni Amman Thirukoil - Madhavaram Milk Colony Quarters (near Bottle ground)
 Sri Thulukkanathamman Koil - Madhavaram Milk Colony Quarters (MMC Main Road)
 Perumal Kovil (Kamaraj Salai, Edaima Nagar)
 Muthumariamman Kovil (Kamaraj Salai, Periyamathur)
 Arasamara Vinayagar Temple (Kamaraj Salai, Periyamathur)
 Sri Devi Kalasathamman Temple (Selaivayal)
 Sai Baba Temple (Bank Colony)
 Sri Sarva Sakthi Ganapathi Aalayam (Bank Colony 5th Street)
 Madras Pentecostal Assembly Church (Ganapathy Nagar)
 Mosques

Location and Surroundings
Madhavaram Milk Colony, most often called "MMC" or Paalpannai is a neighbourhood located north of Chennai city. It borders Kodungaiyur to the east, Madhavaram to the west, Moolakadai to the south, and Manali to the north. The main thoroughfare in the area is the Milk Colony Road.
Though this place is inside to the Chennai city limit (Chennai corporation), this place is probably the most calm, cool and segregated from urban commotion. The natural surroundings here  display a rural like atmosphere. This also attracts the views of many peoples, so this place also acts as a suiting spot for many Tamil films. Right from the main gate to the veterinary university campus, there are trees (particularly palm trees) and cattle sheds on both sides of the road, replicating a typical village atmosphere. Madhavaram milk colony is one among the 200 wards in the Chennai Corporation. Madhavaram falls under ZONE 3 in Chennai corporation.

Transportation

Metropolitan Transport Corporation (MTC) runs passenger buses to Madhavaram Milk Colony from other major parts of the Chennai city. Though there is no origin or destination service from/to Madhavaram Milk Colony, Good number of buses  passes  through Madhavaram Milk Colony. Some of them are:

Educational Institutions
Madhavaram Milk Colony's colleges, universities and institutes are:
 Tamil Nadu Veterinary and Animal Sciences University (TANUVAS)
 College of Fish Nutrition and Food Technology of Tamil Nadu Dr. J. Jayalalithaa Fisheries University (TNJFU)
 Paraprofessional Institute of Fisheries Technology of Tamil Nadu Dr. J. Jayalalithaa Fisheries University (TNJFU)
 Horticulture Training Centre
 Institute of Horticulture Management
 Agricultural Co-operative Staff Training Institute
 Jayagovind Harigopal Agarwal Agarsen College
 Institute for Poultry Science and Management

Famous CBSE schools
 Greenfield Chennai International School
 Velammal New Gen School
 Everwin Vidhyaashram School
 KC Toshniwal Vivekananda Vidyalaya School
 Sri Chaitanya Techno School

Famous State / Matric schools
 St Thomas Matriculation Higher Secondary School
 Bosco Academy Matriculation Higher Secondary School
 Government Higher Secondary School
 Padma Prakash Matriculation Higher Secondary School 
 Ramakrishna Matriculation Higher Secondary School
 St. Anne's Girls High School
 St. Ann's Matriculation Higher Secondary School
 St. Joseph's Matriculation Higher Secondary School
 St. Thomas' School 
 Sri Shakthi Matriculation School
 Madhavaram Govt Higher Secondary School

Hospitals and Health care
 Madhavaram Milk Colony Government Hospital
 K.M Multi Specialty Hospital
 Murari Hospital
 St' Antony hospital
 Anand Hospital
 Fathima Nursing Home

Neighbourhoods
Most notable neighbourhoods in Madhavaram Milk colony are

Madhavaram Milk Colony is just 5 km from Perambur and 6.7 km from Manali and 13 km from Annanagar and 11.5 km from Tiruvotiiyur. The nearest railway station is Perambur and Chennai Central at just 6 km.

Aavin

Madhavaram Milk Colony is the Tamil Nadu Co-operative milk producers' Federation Ltd's first dairy in Chennai. Started in the year 1992, this unit is the central dairy of Aavin with a capacity of 3.0 LLPD. This Dairy carry out Processing, Packing and Distribution of Milk and Milk Products as per HACCP, MMPO and NDDB Norms.
The Head Office of Tamil Nadu Co-operative milk producers' Federation Ltd. is located at Aavin Illam near to the Main gate.

Aavin Park
During the 1980s the Tamil Nadu cooperative milk federation was running in loss. As a part of initiative to implement the market of milk and milk products, the authorities decided to establish an ice cream parlour along with a park for children to play. The park consists of a small artificial lake along with a small fish pond

Madhavaram Botanical Garden
Madhavaram Botanical Garden is a botanical garden in Chennai, India, set up by the horticulture department of the Government of Tamil Nadu. The garden, under construction, is expected to be opened by February 2013 and will be the largest botanical garden in the city.  The garden is located at the State horticulture farm in Madhavaram Milk Colony.  Encompassing an area of 28 acres, it is being built at a cost of ₹ 57.3 million.  Foundation stone for the garden was laid on 15 September 2010.  As of October 2012, 80 percent of the civil work has been completed and work is in progress to construct a food court, ticket counters and a compound wall.  A small bridge has been built to attract birds from where visitors will get a view of the lake.  The garden will have nearly 400 species of plants.  A glasshouse similar to the one in the garden at Udhagamandalam will also be created, with different types of gardens, including herbal, flowers, bonsai and trellis gardens, in addition to mazes, a play area for children, cascades and many fountains.  The garden will also have an open-air theatre with a capacity to seat nearly 150 people.  There will also be a nursery outlet at the garden.

Chennai Metro Rail Limited – Phase II
In December-2016, it was announced that Chennai Metro Phase 2 would be for 104 km (65 mi) spreading across 104 stations.  In July 2017, in a suo motu statement in the State Legislative Assembly, an extension in Phase II, involving an additional cost of ₹38,500 million to the original phase II cost of ₹850,470 million, was announced.  Once Phase 1 draws to a close in 2019–20, construction on Phase 2 of Chennai Metros project will begin. This phase is currently in the proposal stage and in its latest avatar has been proposed to be 107.55 km long with another 25 km in the pipeline. After phase 2 is built and opened in 2028 (estimated), Chennai's metro network will become roughly 176.70 km long.

This phase involves the construction of 2 out of 3 new lines on standard gauge tracks:

• Line-3 – Purple Line – Madhavaram – SIPCOT (45.77 km) with 50 stations

Stations: Madhavaram Milk Colony (interchange with Line-5), Thapal Petti, Murari Hospitial, Moolakadai, Sembiyam, Perambur Market, Perambus Metro, Ayanavaram, Otteri, Pattalam, Perambur Barracks Road, Purasaiwakkam High Road, Kelley's, KMC, Chetpet Metro, Sterling Road Junction, Nungambakkam, Gemini, Thousand Lights (interchange with Line-1), Royapettah Govt Hospital, Radhakrishnan Salai Junction, Thirumayilai Metro (interchange with Line-4), Madaiveli, Greenways Road Metro, Adyar Junction, Adyar Depot, Indira Nagar, Thiruvanmiyur, Taramani Link Road, Nehru Nagar, Kandhanchavadi, Perungudi, Thoralpakkam, Mettukuppam, PTC Colony, Okkiyampet, Karapakkam, Okkiyam Thoralpakkam, Sholinganallur (interchange with Line-5), Sholinganallur Lake, Sri Ponniamman Temple, Sathyabama University, St Joseph College, Seemancheri, Gandhi Nagar, Nayalur, Siruseri, Sipcot 1 and Sipcot 2

• Line-5 – Red Line – Madhavaram – Sholinganallur (44.66 km) with 46 stations

Stations: Madhavaram Milk Colony (interchange with Line-3), Venugopal Nagar, Assissi Nagar, Manjambakkam, Velmurugan Nagar, MMBT, Shastri Nagar, Terreri, Kolathur, Srinivasa Nagar, Villivakkam Metro, Villivakkam Bus Terminus, Nadhamuni, Anna Nagar Depot, Thirumangalam, Kendriya Vidyalaya Anna Nagar, Kallamman Koli Street, CMBT (interchange with Line-2, Line-4), Kannlamman Nagar, Nerkundram, Madhuravoyal, Ganga Nagar, Valasaravakkam, Alwarthirunagar, Suresh Nagar, Ramapuram, Sathya Nagar, Chennai Trade Centre, Butt Road, Alandur (interchange with Line-1 and Line-2), St Thomas Mount (interchange with Line-2), Adambakkam MRTS, Vanuvampet, Puzhuthivakkam, Madipakkam Koot Road, Kilkattalai, Echangadu, Kovilabakkam, Vellakkal, Medavakkam Koot Road, Medavakkam Junction, Perumbakkam, Global Hospitals, Elcot and Sholinganallur (interchange with Line-3).

History
The Madhavaram Milk Colony was established by Karmaverar K. Kamaraj, former chief minister of Tamil Nadu in 1965 as a region for milk and milk-producing people. It was under the period of whom a field called jersey field was established as a cow field with at least 200 license holders. Then he built a residential area for those people and the area was named as Madhavaram Paalpannai. Veterinary buildings and institutions include:
 The central fisheries and aquaculture research center
 The horticulture research and training institute
 The Tamil Nadu Animal Science and veterinary University (TANUVAS)
 The chemicals and pesticide safety laboratory'''
 The central Palmgur research institute (under CSIR, Neither a Palm nor a Gur)
 The parmocovigilance laboratory for animal feed and food safety
 The Central Fertilizers Chemical Laboratory

References

 

Economy of Chennai
Neighbourhoods in Chennai
Suburbs of Chennai